Joe Small (born 1830) was a notable New Zealand goldminer, entertainer and songwriter. He was born in London, England in about 1830. He toured with Charles Robert Thatcher.

References

1830 births
New Zealand gold prospectors
English emigrants to New Zealand
New Zealand singer-songwriters
Year of death unknown